Real Estate and Housing Association of Bangladesh is a real estate trade body in Bangladesh. Shamsul Alamin is president of REHAB.

History
The association was founded in 1991 with eleven members which had grown to 1151 members by 2016. It holds an annual real estate in Bangladesh fair titled the Rehab fair in Dhaka.

References

Organisations based in Dhaka
1991 establishments in Bangladesh
Trade associations based in Bangladesh
Real estate in Bangladesh